Rod, Ror, Ród, Rőd, Rød, Röd, ROD, or R.O.D. may refer to:

Devices 
 Birch rod, made out of twigs from birch or other trees for corporal punishment
 Ceremonial rod, used to indicate a position of authority
 Connecting rod, main, coupling, or side rod, in a reciprocating engine
 Control rod, used to control the rate of fission in a nuclear reactor
 Divining rod, two rods believed by some to find water in a practice known as dowsing
 Fishing rod, a tool used to catch fish, like a long pole with a hook on the end
 Lightning rod, a conductor on top of a building to protect the building in the event of lightning by taking the charge harmlessly to earth
 Measuring rod, a kind of ruler
 Switch (corporal punishment), a piece of wood as used as a staff or for corporal punishment, or a bundle of such switches
 Truss rod, a steel part inside a guitar neck used for its tension adjustment

Arts and entertainment
 Read or Die, a Japanese anime and manga
 Read or Die (OVA), an original video animation based on the manga
 Read or Dream, a manga set in the Read or Die universe
 R.O.D the TV, a 26-episode anime series
 Röd, a 2009 album by Swedish band Kent
 Rod Norman, a character in the soap opera EastEnders
 Rod (Avenue Q), a character in the stage musical Avenue Q
 Rod Flanders, a character in the TV series The Simpsons
 "R.O.D.", a 2013 song by Korean rapper G-Dragon featured on his second studio album Coup d'Etat

People
 Rod (given name)
 Rod (surname)
 Rød (surname)
 Dalel Singh Ror

Places
 Ród, a village in Tilişca Commune, Sibiu County, Romania
 Rød (disambiguation), several populated places in Norway
 Rőd, Aiton, from the Hungarian name for Rediu, a village in Aiton Commune, Cluj County, Romania
 Rod, California, a former settlement in Kern County
 Rod (river), a tributary of the Apold in Sibiu County, Romania

Science and technology
 Cuisenaire rods, to teach children arithmetics
 Rod-shaped bacterium, a shape of bacteria such as E. coli
 Rod (optical phenomenon), a photographic artifact claimed by some to be alien life
 Rod (unit), an Imperial unit of length, also known as the pole or perch
 Rod cell, a cell found in the retina that is sensitive to light/dark (black/white)
 Real-time outbreak and disease surveillance (RODS)
 rod, ISO 639-3 code for the Rogo language of Nigeria
 Rate of descent (RoD), a measurement in aviation.

Other uses
 Ror is a Pure Hindu Kshatriya Indian Caste.
 Railway Operating Division, a division of the British Army's Royal Engineers
 Record of Decision, a formal decision document issued by the United States government
 Rod (god), a Slavic creator god 
 Rods (tarot suit)
 Roughly Obsess and Destroy, a professional wrestling stable
 A dowel
 A firearm

See also
 
 
 DeRodd, DeAndre McCullough's brother, on The Corner
 Hrod (disambiguation)
 Hot rod, often also referred to as "rod"
 Pole (disambiguation)
 Rodd, a surname
 Rood (disambiguation)
 Staff (disambiguation)
 Stick (disambiguation)